Daniel Singer may refer to:

 Daniel Singer (journalist) (1926–2000), British journalist and socialist writer
 Daniel Singer (actor) (born 1959), American actor